Iteration marks are characters or punctuation marks that represent a duplicated character or word.

Chinese
However, it is not used in formal writing anymore, and it never appeared in printed matter. In a tabulated table or list, vertical repetition can be represented by a ditto mark.

History
Iteration marks have been occasionally used for more than two thousand years in China.

Malayo-Polynesian languages

In Filipino, Indonesian, and Malay, words that are repeated can be shortened with the use of numeral "2". The usage of "2" can be also replaced with superscript "" (e.g.  for ). Suffixes may be added after "2", for example in the word  ("Western in nature", from the basic word  ("West") with the prefix  and suffix ).

The use of this mark dates back to the time when these languages were written with Arabic script, specifically the Jawi or Pegon varieties. The use of Arabic numeral  was also adapted to several Brahmi derived scripts of the Malay archipelago, notably Javanese, Sundanese, Lontara, and Makassaran. As the Latin alphabet was introduced to the region, the Western-style Arabic numeral "2" came to be use for Latin-based orthography.

The use of "2" as an iteration mark was official in Indonesia up to 1972, as part of the Republican Spelling System. Its usage was discouraged when the Enhanced Indonesian Spelling System was adopted, and even though it commonly found in handwriting or old signage, it is considered to be inappropriate for formal writing and documents.

Japanese
Japanese has various iteration marks for its three writing systems, namely kanji, hiragana, and katakana, but only the (horizontal) kanji iteration mark is commonly used today.

In Japanese, iteration marks (or ) are used to represent a duplicated character representing the same morpheme. The use of two kanji in place of an iteration mark is allowed, and in simple cases may be used due to being easier to write.

In contrast, while  is written with the iteration mark, as the morpheme is duplicated,  is written with the character duplicated, because it represents different morphemes ( and ).

Kanji
This symbol originates from a simplified form of the character , a variant of  written in the grass script style.

Although Japanese kanji iteration marks are borrowed from Chinese, the grammatical function of duplication differs, as do the conventions on the use of these characters.

While Japanese does not have a grammatical plural form per se, some kanji can be reduplicated to indicate plurality (as a collective noun, not many individuals).

; 
; 

However, for some words duplication may alter the meaning:

; 
; 
; 

Using  instead of repeating kanji is usually the preferred form, with two restrictions:
 the reading must be the same, possibly with sound change (as above), and
 the repetition must be within a single word.
When the reading is different, the second kanji is often simply written out to avoid confusion. Examples of such include:
 
 
 
The repetition mark is not used in every case where two identical characters appear side by side, but only where the repetition itself is etymologically significant—when the repetition is part of a single morpheme (discrete word). Where a character ends up appearing twice as part of a compound, it is usually written out in full:

, from  +  ("democracy" + "principle"); the abbreviated  is only occasionally seen.

Kana
Kana uses different iteration marks; one for hiragana, and one for katakana, .

Unlike the kanji iteration marks, which do not reflect sound changes, kana iteration marks closely reflect sound, and the kana iteration marks can be combined with the  voicing mark to indicate that the repeated syllable should be voiced, for example  .

While widespread in old Japanese texts, the kana iteration marks are generally not used in modern Japanese outside proper names, though they may appear in informal handwritten texts.

Repeating multiple characters

In addition to the single-character iteration marks, there are also two-character-sized repeat marks, which are used to repeat two or more characters. They are used in vertical writing only, and they are effectively obsolete in modern Japanese. They stretch to fill the space typically occupied by two characters, but may indicate a repetition of more than two characters—they indicate that the preceding word or phrase be repeated. For example, the duplicated phrase  may be repeated as —note that here it repeats four characters.

As support for these is limited, the ordinary forward slash  and backward slash  are occasionally used as substitutes.

This practice is also uncommon in modern writing, though it is occasionally seen in horizontal writing as a substitute for the vertical repeat mark.

Unlike the single-kana iteration mark, if the first kana is voiced, the unvoiced version  alone will repeat the voiced sound.

This is prescribed by the Japanese Ministry of Education in its 1981 Cabinet notification prescribes, rule #6.

Nuosu

In the Nuosu language,  is used to represent a doubled sound, for example , . It is used in all forms of writing.

Tangut

In Tangut manuscripts the sign  is sometimes used to represent a doubled character; this sign does not occur in printed texts.

Egyptian hieroglyphs
In Egyptian hieroglyphs, the signs: zp:Z1*Z1   —   , literally meaning "two times", repeat the previous sign or word.

Khmer, Thai and Lao
In Khmer,  as for Thai,  and Lao,  represent a repeated syllable where as it besides the word. This used to be written as numeral two and the form changed over time. A repeated word could be used either, to demonstrate plurality, to emphasize or to soften the meaning of the original word.

Ditto mark 

In English, Spanish, French, Italian, German, Portuguese, Czech, Polish and Turkish lists, the ditto mark (″) represents a word repeated from the equivalent position in the line above it; or an evenly-spaced row of ditto marks represents any number of words repeated from above. For example:

 Two pounds of lettuce
 Three   ″         ″  tomatoes
 Four      ″      ″ onions
 One pound     ″ carrots

This is common in handwriting and formerly in typewritten texts.

The separate character  is to be used in the CJK scripts only.

The convention in Polish handwriting, Czech, Swedish, and Austrian German is to use a ditto mark on the baseline together with em-dashes, for example:

See also 
Japanese typographic symbols

References

External links
 

Punctuation
East Asian typography
Kana
Kanji